Del Hodgkinson (birth registered first ¼ 1939) is an English former professional rugby league footballer who played in the 1950s.

Background
Del Hodgkinson's birth was registered in Leeds North district, West Riding of Yorkshire, England.

Playing career

Challenge Cup Final appearances
Del Hodgkinson played , i.e. number 2, and scored a try in Leeds' 9-7 victory over Barrow in the 1956–57 Challenge Cup Final during the 1956–57 season at Wembley Stadium, London on Saturday 11 May 1957, in front of a crowd of 76,318, he was aged-18 at the time.

County Cup Final appearances
Del Hodgkinson played , i.e. number 5, in Leeds' 24-20 victory over Wakefield Trinity in the 1958 Yorkshire County Cup Final during the 1958–59 season at Odsal Stadium, Bradford on Saturday 18 October 1958.

Club career
Del Hodgkinson scored six tries in Leeds' 64-17 victory over Huddersfield in the 1958 Yorkshire County Cup round-1 match during the 1958–59 season at Headingley Rugby Stadium, Leeds on Saturday 30 August 1958.

References

External links
Search for "Hodgkinson" at rugbyleagueproject.org
Rugby League Final 1957 at britishpathe.com
On This Day - 2 January
On This Day - 11 January
On This Day - 9 March
On This Day - 29 September
On This Day - 29 December
Photograph of Del Hodgkinson

1939 births
Living people
English rugby league players
Leeds Rhinos players
Rugby league players from Leeds
Rugby league props